is a Japanese FM station based in Kazuno, Akita, Japan.

References

Radio stations in Japan
Radio stations established in 2013
Mass media in Akita Prefecture